Karin Beier (born 1965 in Cologne) is a German theatre director.

After studying English in Cologne, Karin Beier moved into theatre. She established an English language theatre and staged Shakespeare plays in their source language. Theatres began to grow in popularity, and she became the director of the Düsseldorf Theatre. Here she was able to display her first professional theatre production. In Düsseldorf she studied under Iraqi director David Mouchtar-Samorai.

After her 1994 production of Romeo and Juliet she was invited to the Berliner Theatertreffen and granted an award by the leading German theater magazine Theater heute. The following year she directed productions at the Deutsches Schauspielhaus in Hamburg, Schauspielhaus Bochum, Munich Kammerspiele, and the Burgtheater in Vienna.

In 2004 and 2005 she directed at the Nibelungen-Festival in Worms, performing Christian Friedrich Hebbel's 1861 play Nibelungen.

Since 2007 Beier was the director of the main playhouse in Cologne (Schauspiel Köln). On January 11, 2013 Beier said goodbye before her move to the Deutsches Schauspielhaus, with her last production of an antique drama, The Trojan Women by Euripides. It was based on the work of Jean-Paul Sartre.

References

External links
 Karin Beier: 50 directors working in Germany Goethe-Instituts Website.

Literature
Interview with Karin Beier in: Vivien Gröning, Kirsten Sass: WOMAN@WORK Wege nach dem Abi – Wie FRAU heute Karriere macht. 22 Interviews mit erfolgreichen Frauen. Renningen 2014, .

German theatre directors
1965 births
Living people
Officers Crosses of the Order of Merit of the Federal Republic of Germany